The 2021 Asian Beach Volleyball Championship was a beach volleyball event, held in November 2021 in Phuket, Thailand. It was originally planned to be held in China in July 2020 but was postponed twice due to the COVID-19 pandemic.

Medal summary

Participating nations

Men

 (3)
 (3)
 (3)
 (3)
 (2)
 (2)
 (1)
 (2)
 Thailand (4)

Women

 (3)
 (3)
 (2)
 (1)
 (2)
 (2)
 (2)
 Thailand (4)

Men's tournament

Preliminary round

Pool A 

|}

Pool B

|}

Pool C

|}

Pool D

|}

Pool E

|}

Pool F

|}

Pool G

|}

Pool H

|}

Knockout round

Women's tournament

Preliminary round

Pool A 

|}

Pool B 

|}

Pool C 

|}

Pool D 

|}

Knockout round

References

External links

Complete results

2021
Asian Championships
Beach volleyball
2021 Asian Beach Volleyball Championships
Volleyball events postponed due to the COVID-19 pandemic